The 2011 Welsh Cup Final was the final of the 125th season of the main domestic football cup competition in Wales, the Welsh Cup. The final was played at Parc y Scarlets in Llanelli on 8 May 2011 and marked the third time the final has been staged at the stadium. The match was contested by Bangor City, who beat Gap Connah's Quay 1–0 in their semi-final, and Llanelli who beat The New Saints 1–0 in their semi-final.

Welsh Premier League side Llanelli were looking for their first Welsh Cup win having contested in two previous finals, appearing previously in 2008 losing 1–0 to this year's opponents. While it is Bangor City's 15th appearance in the final, who were looking to make history as the first North Wales club to win four consecutive Welsh Cups.

Route to the final

Bangor City

Llanelli

Pre-match

Officials 
Deganwy-based referee Mark Petch was named as the referee for the 2011 Welsh Cup Final on 12 April 2011. Petch had previously officiated in two Under-19 Internationals and to Welsh Cup semi finals.

His assistants for the 2011 final were Gareth Ayres of Port Talbot, Phil Thomas of Porth, with Bryn Markham-Jones of Wrexham as the fourth official.

Kits 
Both teams wore their home kits.

Match

Details

See also 
2010–11 Welsh Cup
2011 Welsh League Cup Final

References

2011
Finals
Bangor City F.C. matches
Llanelli Town A.F.C.